The arrondissement of Vierzon is an arrondissement of France in the Cher department in the Centre-Val de Loire region. It has 43 communes.

Composition

The communes of the arrondissement of Vierzon, and their INSEE codes, are:

 Allouis (18005)
 Argent-sur-Sauldre (18011)
 Aubigny-sur-Nère (18015)
 Berry-Bouy (18028)
 Blancafort (18030)
 Brinay (18036)
 Brinon-sur-Sauldre (18037)
 Cerbois (18044)
 La Chapelle-d'Angillon (18047)
 Chéry (18064)
 Clémont (18067)
 Dampierre-en-Graçay (18085)
 Ennordres (18088)
 Foëcy (18096)
 Genouilly (18100)
 Graçay (18103)
 Ivoy-le-Pré (18115)
 Lazenay (18124)
 Limeux (18128)
 Lury-sur-Arnon (18134)
 Massay (18140)
 Mehun-sur-Yèvre (18141)
 Ménétréol-sur-Sauldre (18147)
 Méreau (18148)
 Méry-ès-Bois (18149)
 Méry-sur-Cher (18150)
 Nançay (18159)
 Neuvy-sur-Barangeon (18165)
 Nohant-en-Graçay (18167)
 Oizon (18170)
 Presly (18185)
 Preuilly (18186)
 Quincy (18190)
 Sainte-Montaine (18227)
 Sainte-Thorette (18237)
 Saint-Georges-sur-la-Prée (18210)
 Saint-Hilaire-de-Court (18214)
 Saint-Laurent (18219)
 Saint-Outrille (18228)
 Thénioux (18263)
 Vierzon (18279)
 Vignoux-sur-Barangeon (18281)
 Vouzeron (18290)

History

The arrondissement of Vierzon was created in 1984.

As a result of the reorganisation of the cantons of France which came into effect in 2015, the borders of the cantons are no longer related to the borders of the arrondissements. The cantons of the arrondissement of Vierzon were, as of January 2015:

 Argent-sur-Sauldre
 Aubigny-sur-Nère
 La Chapelle-d'Angillon
 Graçay
 Lury-sur-Arnon
 Mehun-sur-Yèvre
 Vierzon-1
 Vierzon-2

References

Vierzon